The following outline is provided as an overview of and topical guide to Italy:

Italy is a unitary parliamentary republic in South-Central Europe, located primarily upon the Italian Peninsula. It is where Ancient Rome originated as a small agricultural community about the 8th century BC, which spread over the course of centuries into the colossal Roman empire, encompassing the whole Mediterranean Basin and merging the Ancient Greek and Roman cultures into one civilization.  This civilization was so influential that parts of it survive in modern law, administration, philosophy and arts, providing the groundwork that the Western world is based upon.

General reference 

 Name of Italy
 Pronunciation: 
 
 Common English country name:  Italy
 Official English country name:  Italian Republic
 Common endonym(s): Italia
 Official endonym(s): Repubblica italiana
 Adjectival(s): Italian 
 Demonym(s): Italian
 Date and time notation in Italy
 International rankings of Italy
 ISO country codes:  IT, ITA, 380
 ISO region codes:  See ISO 3166-2:IT
 Internet country code top-level domain:  .it

Geography of Italy 

Geography of Italy
 Italy is:
 a peninsula
 a country
 a member state of the European Union
 Location:
 Northern Hemisphere and Eastern Hemisphere
 Eurasia
 Europe
 Western Europe
 Southern Europe
 Italian Peninsula
 Time zone:  Central European Time (UTC+01), Central European Summer Time (UTC+02)
 Extreme points of Italy
 North: Glockenkarkopf
 South: Punta Pesce Spada
 East: Capo d'Otranto
 West: Rocca Bernauda
 High: Monte Bianco 
 Low: Contane on the Po Delta  
 Land boundaries:  1,899 km
 (outline) 740 km
 (outline) 488 km
 (outline) 430 km
 (outline) 199 km
 (outline) 39 km
 (outline) 3 km
 Coastline: 7,600 km
 Sharing Adriatic Sea with Croatia 
 Population of Italy: 60,067,554 people (2009/01/31 estimate) - 23rd most populous country
 Area of Italy:  - 71st largest country
 Atlas of Italy

Environment of Italy 

 Climate of Italy
 Conservation in Italy
 Renewable energy in Italy
 Biofuel in Italy
 Geothermal power in Italy
 Hydroelectricity in Italy
 Solar power in Italy
 Wind power in Italy
 Ecoregions in Italy
 Geology of Italy
 Volcanism of Italy
 National parks of Italy
 Marine protected areas of Italy
 Regional parks of Italy
 Wildlife of Italy
 Flora of Italy
 Fauna of Italy
 Amphibians of Italy
 Birds of Italy
 Mammals of Italy
 Reptiles of Italy
 Snakes of Italy

Geographic features of Italy 

 Beaches in Italy
 Canals in Italy
 Caves in Italy
 Earthquakes in Italy
 Glaciers of Italy
 Islands of Italy
 Lakes of Italy
 Mountains of Italy
 Volcanoes in Italy
 Rivers of Italy
 Valleys of Italy
 World Heritage Sites in Italy (See also Transboundary sites)

Regions of Italy 

Regions of Italy

Administrative divisions types 

 Regions of Italy
 Provinces of Italy
 Metropolitan cities of Italy
 Comuni (Municipalities)
 Frazioni

Statistical divisions of Italy 

NUTS of Italy

Groups of regions, regions, and provinces/metropolitan cities of Italy 

 Northwestern Italy
 Piedmont (Region)
 Metropolitan City of Turin
 Province of Vercelli
 Province of Biella
 Province of Verbano-Cusio-Ossola
 Province of Novara
 Province of Cuneo
 Province of Asti
 Province of Alessandria
 Valle d'Aosta (Region)
 Aosta (Province)
 Liguria  (Region)
 Province of Imperia
 Province of Savona
 Metropolitan City of Genoa
 Province of La Spezia
 Lombardy  (Region)
 Province of Varese
 Province of Como
 Province of Lecco
 Province of Sondrio
 Metropolitan City of Milan
 Province of Monza and Brianza
 Province of Bergamo
 Province of Brescia
 Province of Pavia
 Province of Lodi
 Province of Cremona
 Province of Mantua
 Northeastern Italy
 Trentino-Alto Adige/Südtirol (Region)
 Province of Bolzano/Bozen
 Province of Trento
 Veneto  (Region)
 Province of Verona
 Province of Vicenza
 Province of Belluno
 Province of Treviso
 Metropolitan City of Venice
 Province of Padua
 Province of Rovigo
  Friuli-Venezia Giulia  (Region)
 Province of Pordenone
 Province of Udine

 Province of Gorizia
 Province of Trieste
 Emilia-Romagna  (Region)
 Province of Piacenza
 Province of Parma
 Province of Reggio Emilia
 Province of Modena
 Metropolitan City of Bologna
 Province of Ferrara
 Province of Ravenna
 Province of Forlì-Cesena
 Province of Rimini
 Central Italy
 Tuscany  (Region)
 Province of Massa-Carrara
 Province of Lucca
 Province of Pistoia
 Metropolitan City of Florence
 Province of Prato
 Province of Livorno
 Province of Pisa
 Province of Arezzo
 Province of Siena
 Province of Grosseto
 Umbria  (Region)
 Province of Perugia
 Province of Terni
 Marches  (Region)
 Province of Pesaro e Urbino
 Province of Ancona
 Province of Macerata
 Province of Fermo
 Province of Ascoli Piceno
 Latium  (Region)
 Province of Viterbo
 Province of Rieti
 Metropolitan City of Rome Capital
 Province of Latina
 Province of Frosinone
 Southern Italy
 Abruzzo  (Region)
 Province of L'Aquila
 Province of Teramo
 Province of Pescara
 Province of Chieti

 Molise  (Region)
 Province of Isernia
 Province of Campobasso
 Campania  (Region)
 Province of Caserta
 Province of Benevento
 Metropolitan City of Naples
 Province of Avellino
 Province of Salerno
 Apulia  (Region)
 Province of Foggia
 Province of Barletta-Andria-Trani
 Metropolitan City of Bari
 Province of Taranto
 Province of Brindisi
 Province of Lecce
 Basilicata  (Region)
 Province of Potenza
 Province of Matera
 Calabria  (Region)
 Province of Cosenza
 Province of Crotone
 Province of Catanzaro
 Province of Vibo Valentia
 Metropolitan City of Reggio Calabria
 Insular Italy
 Sicily  (Region)
 Province of Trapani
 Metropolitan City of Palermo
 Metropolitan City of Messina
 Province of Agrigento
 Province of Caltanissetta
 Province of Enna
 Metropolitan City of Catania
 Province of Ragusa
 Province of Siracusa
 Sardinia  (Region)
 Province of Olbia-Tempio
 Province of Sassari
 Province of Nuoro
 Province of Ogliastra
 Province of Oristano
 Province of Medio Campidano
 Metropolitan City of Cagliari
 Province of Carbonia-Iglesias

Comuni (municipalities) of Italy 

 Cities of Italy
 Capital of Italy: Rome
 Cities in Italy over 100,000 population
 Hilltowns in Italy

Demography of Italy 

Demographics of Italy

Neighbors of Italy 
Italy shares its north border with:
 Austria
 France
 Slovenia
 Switzerland shares Italy's northern border, and Campione d'Italia is an Italian exclave in Switzerland.

Independent states surrounded by Italy (otherwise within Italy's borders) include:
 San Marino
 Vatican City

Government and politics of Italy 

Politics of Italy
 Form of government: parliamentary multi-party representative democratic republic
 Capital of Italy: Rome
 Corruption in Italy
 Elections in Italy
 Primary elections in Italy
 Orders, decorations, and medals of Italy
 Political ideologies in Italy
 Anarchism in Italy
 Liberalism and radicalism in Italy
 Socialism in Italy
 Political parties in Italy
 Political scandals of Italy
 Public administration in Italy
 Racism in Italy
 Taxation in Italy

Branches of the government of Italy 

 

Government of Italy

Head of State  
 President of Italy (see also Head of State)
 List of presidents of Italy

Executive branch  

 Prime Minister of Italy (a.k.a. President of the Council of Ministers, see also Head of government)
 List of prime ministers of Italy
 Council of Ministers of Italy

Legislative branch 

 Parliament of Italy
 Italian Chamber of Deputies (lower house)
 Italian Senate (upper house)

Judicial branch 

 Supreme Court of Cassation (Corte Suprema di Cassazione)
 Constitutional Court of Italy
 Judiciary of Italy

Foreign relations of Italy 

Foreign relations of Italy
 CIA activities in Italy

International organization membership 
The Italian Republic is a member of:

African Development Bank Group (AfDB) (nonregional member)
Arctic Council (observer)
Asian Development Bank (ADB) (nonregional member)
Australia Group
Bank for International Settlements (BIS)
Black Sea Economic Cooperation Zone (BSEC) (observer)
Caribbean Development Bank (CDB)
Central American Integration System (SICA) (observer)
Central European Initiative (CEI)
Confederation of European Paper Industries (CEPI)
Council of Europe (CE)
Council of the Baltic Sea States (CBSS) (observer)
Economic and Monetary Union (EMU)
Euro-Atlantic Partnership Council (EAPC)
European Bank for Reconstruction and Development (EBRD)
European Investment Bank (EIB)
European Organization for Nuclear Research (CERN)
European Space Agency (ESA)
European Union (EU)
Food and Agriculture Organization (FAO)
Group of Seven (G7)
Group of Eight (G8)
Group of Ten (G10)
Group of Twenty Finance Ministers and Central Bank Governors (G20)
Inter-American Development Bank (IADB)
International Atomic Energy Agency (IAEA)
International Bank for Reconstruction and Development (IBRD)
International Chamber of Commerce (ICC)
International Civil Aviation Organization (ICAO)
International Criminal Court (ICCt)
International Criminal Police Organization (Interpol)
International Development Association (IDA)
International Energy Agency (IEA)
International Federation of Red Cross and Red Crescent Societies (IFRCS)
International Finance Corporation (IFC)
International Fund for Agricultural Development (IFAD)
International Hydrographic Organization (IHO)
International Labour Organization (ILO)
International Maritime Organization (IMO)
International Mobile Satellite Organization (IMSO)
International Monetary Fund (IMF)
International Olympic Committee (IOC)
International Organization for Migration (IOM)

International Organization for Standardization (ISO)
International Red Cross and Red Crescent Movement (ICRM)
International Telecommunication Union (ITU)
International Telecommunications Satellite Organization (ITSO)
International Trade Union Confederation (ITUC)
Inter-Parliamentary Union (IPU)
Latin American Economic System (LAES) (observer)
Multilateral Investment Guarantee Agency (MIGA)
Nonaligned Movement (NAM) (guest)
North Atlantic Treaty Organization (NATO)
Nuclear Energy Agency (NEA)
Nuclear Suppliers Group (NSG)
Organisation for Economic Co-operation and Development (OECD)
Organization for Security and Cooperation in Europe (OSCE)
Organisation for the Prohibition of Chemical Weapons (OPCW)
Organization of American States (OAS) (observer)
Paris Club
Permanent Court of Arbitration (PCA)
Schengen Convention
Southeast European Cooperative Initiative (SECI) (observer)
Unione Latina
United Nations (UN)
United Nations Conference on Trade and Development (UNCTAD)
United Nations Educational, Scientific, and Cultural Organization (UNESCO)
United Nations High Commissioner for Refugees (UNHCR)
United Nations Industrial Development Organization (UNIDO)
United Nations Interim Force in Lebanon (UNIFIL)
United Nations Military Observer Group in India and Pakistan (UNMOGIP)
United Nations Mission for the Referendum in Western Sahara (MINURSO)
United Nations Relief and Works Agency for Palestine Refugees in the Near East (UNRWA)
United Nations Truce Supervision Organization (UNTSO)
Universal Postal Union (UPU)
Western European Union (WEU)
World Confederation of Labour (WCL)
World Customs Organization (WCO)
World Federation of Trade Unions (WFTU)
World Health Organization (WHO)
World Intellectual Property Organization (WIPO)
World Meteorological Organization (WMO)
World Tourism Organization (UNWTO)
World Trade Organization (WTO)
World Veterans Federation
Zangger Committee (ZC)

Law and order in Italy 

 Law of Italy
Capital punishment in Italy
Censorship in Italy
Constitution of Italy
Copyright law of Italy
Italian Code of Criminal Procedure
Italian law codes
Italian Racial Laws
Life imprisonment in Italy
Speed limits in Italy
 Crime in Italy
Corruption in Italy
Human trafficking in Italy
 Organized crime in Italy
Prostitution in Italy
Terrorism in Italy
 Human rights in Italy
Abortion in Italy
Fathers' rights
Freedom of the press in Italy
Freedom of religion in Italy
LGBT rights in Italy
Recognition of same-sex unions in Italy
Religious freedom in Italy
 Judiciary of Italy
 Law enforcement in Italy
Carabinieri
Carabinieri Art Squad
Carabinieri Cavalry Regiment
Corazzieri
Carabinieri Mobile Units Division
Gruppo di intervento speciale
Raggruppamento Operativo Speciale
Guardia di Finanza
Counter-terrorism Rapid Response
Gruppo di investigazione criminalità organizzata
Municipal police (Italy)
Polizia di Stato
Divisione Investigazioni Generali e Operazioni Speciali
Nucleo Operativo Centrale di Sicurezza
Polizia Ferroviaria
Polizia Penitenziaria
Polizia Stradale
Provincial police

Military of Italy 

Military of Italy
 Armed forces of Italy:
 Army of Italy: Esercito Italiano
 Navy of Italy: Marina Militare
Corps of the Port Captaincies – Coast Guard
 Air force of Italy: Aeronautica Militare
 Gendarmerie of Italy: Carabinieri
 Military history of Italy
 Wars involving Italy

History of Italy 

History of Italy

By period 

Timeline of Italian history
 Prehistoric Italy
 Etruscan civilization
 Italic peoples
 Nuragic civilization
 Terramare culture
 Villanovan culture
 Magna Graecia (8th–7th centuries BC)
 Italy during Roman times (8th century BC – 6th century AD)
 Roman Kingdom
 Roman Republic
 Roman Empire
 Italy in the Middle Ages (6th–14th centuries)
 Italian Renaissance (14th–16th centuries)
 Italian Wars (1494–1559)
 History of Italy during foreign domination and the unification (1559 –1814)
 Modern history of Italy
 Italian unification (1814 –1861)
 History of the Kingdom of Italy (1861–1946)
 Italian irredentism
 Italian Colonial Empire
 Italian fascism
 Italian Civil War
 History of the Italian Republic (1946 – present)
 Italian economic miracle
 Years of Lead (Italy)
 Mani pulite
 COVID-19 pandemic in Italy

By region 

 History of Florence
 History of Milan
 History of Naples
 History of Rome
 History of Tuscany
 History of Palermo

By subject 
 Economic history of Italy
 Genetic history of Italy
 Historical states of Italy
 Military history of Italy
 Military history of Italy during World War I
 Military history of Italy during World War II
 Music history of Italy
 History of coins in Italy
 History of Italian citizenship
 History of Italian culture (1700s)
 History of Italian fashion
 History of Italian flags
 Flags of Napoleonic Italy
 History of rail transport in Italy
 History of Roman Catholicism in Italy
 History of the Jews in Italy

Culture of Italy 

 

Culture of Italy
 Trecento
 Quattrocento
 Cinquecento
 Seicento
 Settecento
 Ottocento
 Cultural icons of Italy
 Culture of Rome
 Architecture of Italy
Ancient Roman architecture
Italian Gothic architecture
Venetian Gothic architecture
Italian Renaissance and Mannerist architecture
Palladian architecture
Italian Baroque architecture
Sicilian Baroque
Italian Neoclassical architecture
Neoclassical architecture in Milan
Italian modern and contemporary architecture
Fascist architecture
North-Western Italian architecture
List of Italian architects
 List of castles in Italy
 List of cathedrals in Italy
 List of libraries in Italy
 List of palaces in Italy
 Cuisine of Italy
Beer in Italy
Italian food products
Italian meal structure
Italian wine
Veneto wine
Cultural icons
 Gardens in Italy
 Italian garden
Italian nationalism
 Italophilia
 Languages of Italy
Central Italian
Geographical distribution of Italian speakers
Italian language
Regional Italian
 Media in Italy
Magazines in Italy
Newspapers in Italy
Radio in Italy
Television in Italy
 Mythology of Italy
 Monuments of Italy
Colosseum
Leaning Tower of Pisa
St Mark's Basilica
 Museums in Italy
 National symbols of Italy
Coat of arms of Italy
Cockade of Italy
Flag of Italy
Flags of regions of Italy
National anthem of Italy
National colours of Italy
National personification of Italy
 Philosophy
Italian idealism
 Public holidays in Italy
Ferragosto
Festa della Repubblica
Liberation Day (Italy)
 Traditions of Italy
Carnival of Venice
Feast of San Gennaro
Palio di Siena
 Units of measurement
 World Heritage Sites in Italy (See also Transboundary sites)

Art in Italy 
 Art in Italy
Etruscan art
Roman art
Renaissance painting
Baroque art
Rococo art
Neoclassical and 19th-century art
Modern and contemporary art
Futurism
Metaphysical art
Novecento Italiano
Spatialism
Arte Povera
Transavantgarde
 Italian ballet
 Cinema of Italy
Italian futurism in cinema
Italian neorealism
 Italian design
 Italian fashion
 Literature of Italy
Italian poetry
Sicilian School
Dolce Stil Novo
Marinism
Pontifical Academy of Arcadia
Venetian literature
Verismo (literature)
Western Lombard literature
 Folklore of Italy
Italian folk dance
Italian folk music
 Music of Italy
Italian classical music
Italian composers
Italian opera
Italian popular music
 Mozart in Italy
 Music history of Italy
 Music media in Italy
 Music of the Trecento
 Sculpture of Italy
 Theatre in Italy
Commedia dell'arte

People in Italy 
 Italians
 People from Italy
 Italian actors
 Italian actresses
 Italian architects
 Italian women artists
 Italian chefs
 child actors
 Italian classical composers
 Italian comedians
 Italian composers
 Italian designers
 Italian explorers
 Italian film directors
 Italian inventors
 Italian journalists
 Italian lawyers
 Italian mathematicians
 Italian Nobel laureates
 Italian painters
 Italian philosophers
 Italian-language poets
 Italian politicians
 Italian scientists
 Italian women writers
 Italian writers
 Italian diaspora
 Immigration to Italy
Monarchy of Italy
 Nobility of Italy
Papal nobility
 Social class in Italy
 Women in Italy

Ethnic groups in Italy 
 Algerians in Italy
 Arabs in Italy
 Arbëreshë people
 Armenians in Italy
 Australians in Italy
 Bangladeshis in Italy
 Bulgarians in Italy
 Cape Verdeans in Italy
 Chinese people in Italy
 Congolese people in Italy
 Croats of Italy
 Cuban people in Italy
 Dominican people in Italy
 Egyptians in Italy
 Ghanaian people in Italy
 Greeks in Italy
 Indians in Italy
 Moroccans in Italy
 Nepalis in Italy
 Nigerian people in Italy
 Pakistanis in Italy
 Peruvians in Italy
 Romani people in Italy
 Romanians in Italy
 Senegalese people in Italy
 Serbs in Italy
 Somali people in Italy
 Swiss people in Italy
 Sri Lankans in Italy
 Tamils in Italy
 Tunisian people in Italy
 Turks in Italy
 Ukrainians in Italy
 Uruguayans in Italy

Religion in Italy 

Religion in Italy
 Bahá'í Faith in Italy
 Buddhism in Italy
 Christianity in Italy
 Apostolic Church in Italy
 Assemblies of God in Italy
 Baptist Evangelical Christian Union of Italy
 Catholic Church in Italy
 Eastern Orthodoxy in Italy
 Greek Orthodox Archdiocese of Italy
 Orthodox Church in Italy
 Evangelical Reformed Baptist Churches in Italy
 Federation of Evangelical Churches in Italy
 List of Catholic dioceses in Italy
 Lutheran Evangelical Church in Italy
 Methodist Evangelical Church in Italy
 Protestantism in Italy
Waldensian Evangelical Church
 Old Catholic Church in Italy
 Oriental Orthodoxy in Italy
 Hinduism in Italy
 Islam in Italy
 Judaism in Italy
 Sikhism in Italy
 Taoist Church of Italy

Sport in Italy 

Sport in Italy
 American football
 Italian Football League
 Athletics in Italy
 Auto racing
Italian Grand Prix
 Speedway Grand Prix of Italy
 Baseball
 Italian Baseball League
 Italy national baseball team
 Basketball
 Italian basketball league system
 Italian Basketball Federation
 Lega Basket Serie A
 Serie A2 (basketball)
 Serie B Basket
 Lega Basket Femminile
 Serie A2 (women's basketball)
 Italy men's national basketball team
 Italy men's national under-20 basketball team
 Italy men's national under-19 basketball team
 Italy men's national under-17 basketball team
 Italy women's national 3x3 team
 Italy women's national basketball team
 Italy women's national 3x3 team
 Cricket
 Italian national cricket team
 Cycling
 Italy national cycling team
 Italian Cycling Federation
 Italian records in track cycling
 Futsal in Italy
 Italy national futsal team
 Golf
 Italian Open
 Ice hockey in Italy
 Italian Ice Sports Federation
 Italy men's national ice hockey team
 Italy at the Olympics
 Italian National Olympic Committee
 Rugby football
 Rugby union in Italy
 Rugby league in Italy
 Tennis in Italy
 Italian Open
 Volleyball
 Italian Volleyball League

Basketball in Italy 
 Italian basketball league system
 Italian Basketball Federation
 Lega Basket Serie A
 Serie A2 (basketball)
 Serie B Basket
 Italy men's national basketball team
 Italy men's national under-20 basketball team
 Italy men's national under-19 basketball team
 Italy men's national under-17 basketball team
 Italy women's national 3x3 team
 Italy women's national basketball team
 Italy women's national 3x3 team
 Lega Basket Femminile
 Serie A2 (women's basketball)

Football in Italy 

Football in Italy
 Association football league system in Italy note: superseded by Italian football league system
 Italian Football Federationhttps://en.wikipedia.org/w/index.php?title=Outline_of_Italy&action=submit
 Serie A
 Lega Nazionale Professionisti Serie A
 Serie B
 Lega Nazionale Professionisti Serie B
 Lega Pro
 Football derbies in Italy
 Football records in Italy
 Italian Football Hall of Fame
 List of football clubs in Italy
 List of football stadiums in Italy
 Italy national football team
 Italy national under-21 football team
 Italy national under-20 football team
 Italy national under-19 football team
 Italy national under-17 football team
 Italy women's national football team
 Supercoppa Italiana

Other sports popular in Italy 

 Combat sports
 Italian school of swordsmanship
 Italy national fencing team
 Equestrian sports
 Italian flat horse races
 Italian jump horse races
 Motorcycle racing
 Roller hockey
 Water sports
 Italian Swimming Federation
 Italy men's national water polo team
 Italy women's national water polo team
 Winter sports
 Italy national alpine ski team

Economy and infrastructure of Italy 

Economy of Italy

 Economic rank, by nominal GDP (2018): 8th (eighth)
 Agriculture in Italy
 Artichoke production in Italy
 Banking in Italy
 Bank of Italy
 Banks in Italy
Borsa Italiana
 Communications in Italy
 Telecommunications in Italy
 Internet in Italy
 Companies of Italy
Currency of Italy: Euro (see also: Euro topics)
Former currency: Italian lira
ISO 4217: EUR
 Economic history of Italy
Economy of Italy under fascism
Italian economic battles
Italian economic miracle
 Energy in Italy
 Electricity sector in Italy
 Nuclear power in Italy
 Renewable energy in Italy
Biofuel in Italy
Geothermal power in Italy
Hydroelectricity in Italy
Solar power in Italy
Wind power in Italy
 Exports of Italy
 Gambling in Italy
 Industry in Italy
Automotive industry in Italy
Automobile manufacturers of Italy
Fashion industry of Italy
Fashion in Milan
Steel industry in Italy
 Italian government debt
 Italian regions by GDP
 Science and technology in Italy
 Accademia dei Lincei
 Italian Space Agency
 Southern question
 Taxation in Italy
 Tourism in Italy
Tourism in Milan
Tourism in Rome
Visa policy of the Schengen Area
 Trade unions in Italy
 Transport in Italy
Transport in Milan
Transport in Rome
Airports in Italy
Highway system of Italy (Autostrade)
Road signs in Italy
Rail transport in Italy
High-speed rail in Italy
Railway stations in Italy
Venice People Mover
 Vehicular transport in Italy
Vehicle registration plates of Italy
Speed limits in Italy
 Water supply and sanitation in Italy
 Welfare in Italy

Local economies
Economy of Milan
Economy of Naples
Economy of Rome
Economy of Turin

Education in Italy 

Education in Italy
 Academic grading in Italy
 GPA in Italy
 Schools in Italy
 Secondary education in Italy
 Higher education in Italy
 Academic ranks in Italy
 Universities in Italy

Health in Italy 
Health in Italy
 Healthcare in Italy
Italian health insurance card
 Obesity in Italy
 Smoking in Italy

See also 

Index of Italy-related articles
List of international rankings
Member state of the European Union
Member state of the Group of Twenty Finance Ministers and Central Bank Governors
Member state of the North Atlantic Treaty Organization
Member state of the United Nations
Outline of Europe
Outline of geography

References

External links

 Country profiles
by the BBC News
by the CIA Factbook
by the CIA World Leaders
by the Economist
by the U.S. Department of State
by the World Bank

 Government
President of the Republic of Italy
Chamber of Deputies
Court of Accounts
Ministry of Foreign Affairs
Ministry of Education: International Exchanges
Ministry of Labour and Social Welfare
Ministry of Justice

 Public institutions
National Statistics Office
ENIT Italian State Tourism Board
ENIT North America
Italian Railways
Italian National and Regional Parks

 Other
History of Italy: Primary Documents
List and maps of archaeological sites in Italy
WWW-VL: History: Italy at IUE

 
 
Italy